Complete Vanguard Recordings is a compilation album by the progressive bluegrass band Country Gentlemen, which they recorded for the Vanguard Records label.

Track listing 

 Travelling Kind (Young) 3:28
 Don Quixote (Lightfoot) 2:56
 One Morning In May (Traditional) 3:10
 Casey's Last Ride (Kristofferson) 4:16
 The Leaves That Are Green (Paul Simon) 1:47
 Paradise (John Prine) 3:30
 House of the Rising Sun (Traditional) 3:27
 Catfish John (Bob McDill, Allen Reynolds) 2:31
 Mother Of A Miner's Child (Lightfoot) 2:29
 Bringing Mary Home (John Duffey, Larry Kingston, Chaw Mank) 3:31
 Souvenirs (John Prine) 2:43
 City of New Orleans (Steve Goodman) 3:02
 Willow Creek Dam (Leroy Drumm, Pete Goble) 2:44
 Remembrance of You (Pete Roberts) 2:48
 Irish Spring (Ricky Skaggs) 3:12
 Billy McGhee (Leroy Drumm, Pete Goble) 2:57
 Home in Louisiana (Jimmie Davis) 2:24
 King of Spades (Alexander) 3:03
 The Little Grave (Loudermilk) 2:18
 Delta Queen (Leroy Drumm, Pete Goble) 2:39
 Heartaches (Al Hoffman, John Klenner) 4:25
 Welcome to New York (Bill Emerson, Doyle Lawson) 2:50
 Lord Protect My Soul (Monroe) 2:34
 Circuit Rider (Leroy Drumm, Pete Goble) 2:31

Personnel 
 Charlie Waller - guitar, vocals
 Mike Auldridge - Dobro
 James Bailey - banjo
 Jerry Douglas - Dobro
 Bill Emerson - banjo, vocals
 Al Rogers - drums
 Ricky Skaggs - violin, guitar, vocals
 Bill Yates - bass

References 

The Country Gentlemen compilation albums
2002 compilation albums
Vanguard Records compilation albums